A Possible Projection of the Future / Childhood's End is American musician Al Kooper's fifth album, recorded for and released by Columbia Records in 1972.

Begun with a vague storyline that failed to survive beyond the two title tracks, the album was recorded in London, England at George Martin's AIR Studios with one outtake from New York City (You're A Woman). Six original tracks were surrounded by covers of Bob Dylan ("The Man in Me", which Kooper had originally produced), Smokey Robinson ("Swept For You Baby") and even Jimmy Cliff ("Please Tell Me Why").

The album cover showed Kooper as an eighty-year-old man, decrepit and clutching a Fender Jaguar guitar.

Track listing
All tracks composed by Al Kooper; except where indicated

 "A Possible Projection of the Future" – 6:29
 "The Man in Me" (Bob Dylan) – 3:42
 "Fly On" – 3:15
 "Please Tell Me Why" (Guilly Bright, Jimmy Cliff) – 4:40
 "The Monkey Time" (Curtis Mayfield) – 3:20
 "Let Your Love Shine" – 4:04
 "Swept for You Baby" (Smokey Robinson) – 3:32
 "Bended Knees (Please Don't Leave Me Now)" – 3:40
 "Love Trap" – 4:04
 "Childhood's End" – 3:33

Personnel

Musicians
 Al Kooper – acoustic and electric pianos, organ, guitars, ARP, VCS3 and Moog synthesizers, Mellotron, tambourine, sitar, vocals
 Harvey Brooks – electric bass tracks recorded in America
 Herbie Flowers – electric bass  tracks recorded in England
 Barry Morgan – drums
 Alan Parker – acoustic guitar
 Claudia Lennear, Linda Lewis, Michael Gately and Robert John – backing vocals
 Bobby West – electric bass (track 7) 
 Paul Humphrey – drums (track 7)  
 Bobbye Hall Porter – percussion on (track 7)  
 Clydie King, Venetta Fields, Oma Drake and Edna Wright – backing vocals on (track 7) 
 John Punter - spoken introduction (track 1)

Technical
 Al Kooper – producer
 John Punter – engineer
 Mark Levine – engineer
 Ron Coro – design

References

1972 albums
Columbia Records albums
Al Kooper albums
Albums produced by Al Kooper
Albums recorded at Trident Studios